Blofib is a Guinea-Bissauan football club based in Catió. The club played in the top level Campeonato Nacional da Guine-Bissau during the 1991–92 season.

References

Blofib